Zhao Zhongxiang (16 January 1942 – 16 January 2020) was a well-known Chinese news anchor on the national news program Xinwen Lianbo and television host. He joined China Central Television in 1959.

Biography 
Zhao was born in Ningjin County, Hebei in 1942. He was a host of the CCTV New Year's Gala. He presented programs like Animal World (动物世界 Dongwu shijie) and spoke out on environmental issues such as the protection of endangered tigers and the noise pollution caused by firecrackers.

In 2001 it was announced that he was to be one of 36 athletes and celebrities to be featured on stamps issued in support of Beijing's application for the 2008 Olympics. He also went through a sex scandal with CCTV doctor Rao Ying, with whom he allegedly had a seven-year relationship.

Zhao died in Beijing on 16 January 2020, his 78th birthday.

Career
On July 12, 2010, after two years' of retirement, Zhao Zhongxiang returned to CCTV to broadcast his most famous programs Animal World (Chinese: 动物世界) and Human and Nature (Chinese: 人与自然). What's more, Zhao was also invited to dub for an Expo-related program called World Expo legendary (Chinese: 世博传奇).

Personal life 
Zhao Zhongxiang's wife was Zhang Meizhu. They had a son named Zhao Fang.

References

1942 births
2020 deaths
People from Beijing
Chinese broadcast news analysts
People's Republic of China journalists
Manchu people
CCTV television presenters
Members of the 8th Chinese People's Political Consultative Conference
Members of the 9th Chinese People's Political Consultative Conference
Members of the 10th Chinese People's Political Consultative Conference